Financo, Inc. is a New York-based boutique investment bank focused on the merchandising and retail sector, with offices also in Los Angeles and London.  It was founded in 1971 by Wharton School graduate Gilbert Harrison. His broad experience in deals involving American Eagle, BCBG Max Azria, and Bear Stearns Merchant Banking has made him a sought-after source of expertise. He was contributed at events such as the Financial Times  Business of Luxury Summit.  Financo is also known for hosting a summit every year during the National Retail Federation Convention, covering a major topic relevant to the retail and fashion industries. Financo gathers a CEO Panel and senior executives in the consumer sector discuss the matter.  Their 2011 Annual CEO Panel was hosted by CNBC's Nicole Lapin. Panelists included Dan Schock (Google), Ben Fischman (Rue La La), Chip Wilson (lululemon), and Stephen Zangre (Facebook).

A profile on Gilbert Harrison was featured in the March 2011 issue of The Deal titled, "Relationship Advisory."

History
Financo was founded in 1971 with the same focus on retail that it has today, and completed over 140 deals in its first fourteen years of existence. In 1985, the firm was acquired by Shearson Lehman Brothers (at the time owned by American Express) and became the Lehman Brothers Middle Market Group, still headed by Gilbert Harrison. However, Harrison decided to reacquire the Financo name in 1989 and re-established the firm independent of Shearson Lehman. Today, Financo has become the largest independent retail and consumer advisory firm serving in both the US market and internationally.

Business Divisions

Investment Banking
This department is divided into three primary arms: Mergers & Acquisitions, Financo Securities, and Special Situations. The first arm provides advice on mergers, acquisitions, divestitures, while Financo Securities provides capital-raising services on behalf of retail and merchandising clients. Special Situations focuses on providing restructuring services for financially troubled companies.

Consulting
Financo Global Consulting (FGC), provides advice on product strategy and strategic analysis. The consultants are all experienced industry executives who have served in various high-level positions in the retailing world, such as Chairman of Neiman Marcus, Chairman and CEO of Macy's East, Chairman and CEO of Sears, and CEO of Anne Klein. Currently, sixteen former industry executives serve as FGC consultants.

External links
 Financo website
 National Retail Federation website

Notes

Banks based in New York City
Investment banks in the United States
American companies established in 1971
Financial services companies established in 1971
Banks established in 1971
Shearson Lehman/American Express
1971 establishments in New York City